Trhae Maurice Mitchell (born August 19, 1997) is an American professional basketball player for the Rio Grande Valley Vipers of the NBA G League. He played college basketball for the South Alabama Jaguars.

High school career
Mitchell attended Pebblebrook High School where he was a three-time all-region performer: second team as a sophomore and as a senior and first team as a junior. He also received twice all-county recognition, collecting second-team plaudits in his final two years. During his career, he scored 1,000 points and earned an honorable mention on all-state teams as a junior and third-team as a senior (third team) seasons, the latter after averaging 15 points and seven rebounds per game. As a junior, he led the Falcons to a state semifinal appearance and as a senior, to a state runner-up finish.

College career
Mitchell played college basketball for South Alabama where he recorded 1,127 points, 704 rebounds, 310 assists, 185 blocks and 110 steals in 125 appearances for the Jags. He also was third in school history with 185 career blocks and sixth with 704 rebounds. He also was the only player in the program's history to lead the team in rebounds, assists, steals and blocks in the same season, and second to have 200 rebounds and 100 assists in one year.

Professional career

Rio Grande Valley Vipers (2021–present)
After going undrafted in the 2020 NBA draft, Mitchell signed with the Rio Grande Valley Vipers of the NBA G League after a tryout. As a rookie, he played 11 games and averaged 1.3 points, 1.4 rebounds and 0.7 assists in 8.7 minutes per game.

On October 25, 2021, Mitchell re-signed with the Vipers, appearing this time in 28 games and averaging 9.8 points, 7.4 rebounds, 2.8 assists, 1.4 steals and 1.4 blocks while shooting over 50 percent from the floor, helping the Vipers win a championship.

Personal life
He is the son of Cornelius Mitchell and Danise Bosten and has two siblings, an older sister and a younger brother, while also being related to rapper Lil Yachty. He majored in leisure studies.

References

External links
South Alabama Jaguars bio
RealGM.com profile

1997 births
Living people
African-American basketball players
American men's basketball players
Point guards
Rio Grande Valley Vipers players
South Alabama Jaguars men's basketball players